Christine Gillian Jackson (1962 – 24 January 2016) was a British-born Australian cellist.

Jackson was born in London, and trained at the Guildhall School of Music and Drama. During her classical career, she played as a cellist for the Royal Philharmonic Orchestra, The Hallé, and the Royal Liverpool Philharmonic. She also worked in the pop music area, as a session cellist for artists such as Peter Gabriel, The Beach Boys, Shirley Bassey, Kylie Minogue and Jason Donovan.

Jackson moved to Sydney, Australia to join the Australian Chamber Orchestra. After her stint with the ACO, she remained in Australia, relocating to Cairns, Queensland, where she was known as the "Barefoot Cellist". She worked with Aboriginal musician David Hudson on music for cello and didgeridoo, a combination which she said worked "really well".

In 2009, Jackson had a brain aneurysm which left her paralysed on one side. She died in January 2016, aged 53, following complications from that event.

References

External links
 Alice McVeigh, "On the late Christine Jackson", Music & Vision blog, 5 February 2016

1962 births
2016 deaths
Australian classical cellists
English cellists
British classical cellists
British women classical cellists
Alumni of the Guildhall School of Music and Drama
English emigrants to Australia
20th-century classical musicians
Neurological disease deaths in Queensland
Deaths from intracranial aneurysm
20th-century cellists